Murdoch MacKay Collegiate is a public, co-ed high school in the River East Transcona School Division, located in Winnipeg, Manitoba.

History
The school was named after Murdoch Mackay, a prominent physician, leader of the Manitoba Liberal Party, member of the provincial legislature and long-time Transcona resident. MacKay taught school in his hometown of Melville, Nova Scotia, before coming west and graduating from Manitoba Medical School in 1916. 

When the building opened in September 1963, one year after his death, his wife, Ruby, attended the official dedication ceremony and laying of the cornerstone. The red brick structure opened with 22 rooms, but has undergone numerous expansions since, which have included the addition of Power Mechanics, Aerospace, and Fashion Technology vocational areas.  Murdoch also offers a full range of Advanced Placement courses.

Academics overview
The school offers a rigorous college preparatory curriculum, including three tracks (basic, college preparatory, and Honors/AP) for all core academic courses. The school offers vocational diplomas in Power Mechanics, an accredited Metal Fabrication program (Level 1 Red Seal Machining, Level 1 Red Seal Tool & Die, certified CWB testing facility), Building Construction and Fashion Technology. In addition, the school offers a variety of elective courses from which to choose, allowing students much control in determining their course of study above and beyond the school's graduation requirements. Industrial Arts courses in Graphic Arts, Photography, Multimedia, Electronics and Woods are also offered as optional courses.

Administration
The current administration of the school includes principal Mr. Brian Straub, and vice principals Mr. Jordan Zoppa, and Mrs. Nancy Schroeder.

Athletics
Murdoch has a rich history of competitive and championship caliber athletic teams.
Murdoch's biggest rivals include Transcona Collegiate Institute and Collège Pierre-Elliott-Trudeau.

In 2001, the Murdoch MacKay hockey team won its final 8 games in a row, including a playoff game over rival and neighboring school Pierre Elliot Trudeau en route to a B-Side championship.

In the 2016–17 season Murdoch swept throughout the playoffs and won their second championship, the next year (2017-18) Murdoch became back-to-back champions again sweeping through the playoffs. 

In 2010, the Murdoch Football Team won its first WHSFL Vidruk Division Championship with an 11 - 4 victory over the Kildonan East Reivers at Canad Inns Stadium.

In July 2020 as per an email with Murdoch's administrators and over 800 signatures on an online petition, It was announced that the Clansmen name was dropped and sports teams will now be known as Murdoch MacKay with all Clansmen references removed.

Notable alumni
Susan Auch, Canadian Olympic Speed Skater
Bradford How, Much Music VJ
Russ Romaniuk, Professional Hockey Player {102 NHL Games Played}
Kory Scoran, Professional Hockey Player
Zack Williams, Professional Football Player for the Calgary Stampeders

External links
River East Transcona School Division
Murdoch MacKay Collegiate

High schools in Winnipeg
Educational institutions established in 1963
1963 establishments in Manitoba

Transcona, Winnipeg